Nickelodeon is a pay television network dedicated to kids. Nickelodeon is widely available throughout Europe as a subscription service or free-to-air service; depending on what region in Europe you are living in. Nickelodeon is seen in 24.2 million households throughout Europe, via channels and blocks.

Nickelodeon is operated by ViacomCBS Networks EMEAA on behalf of its owner ViacomCBS. Nickelodeon first launched in Europe in the United Kingdom in 1993 followed by a 1995 launch in Germany, 1 year later in 1996 Nickelodeon launched a Pan-Scandinavian channel for viewers in Sweden, Norway, Denmark & Finland, following this Nickelodeon subsequently launched a pan-European version of the channel and other local Nickelodeon channels.

Pan-European Nickelodeon
Main Article: Nickelodeon (Central & Eastern Europe)

The Pan-European version, known as Nickelodeon airs a selection of programming from Nickelodeon in the USA and local shows from Nickelodeon in the UK, Ireland, Australia and New Zealand. Nickelodeon Europe is a 24-hour pan-regional feed reaching Malta, Romania, Hungary, Albania, Czechia, Slovakia, Croatia, Bosnia & Herzegovina, Slovenia, Serbia, Montenegro, North Macedonia, Bulgaria, Estonia, Latvia, Lithuania, France and Ukraine. The channel is primarily available in English with additional soundtracks in Russian, Hungarian, Romanian, Croatian and Serbian, Slovenian, Bulgarian, Czech, French, Kazakh, Estonian, Lithuanian, Latvian & Turkish. A total of more than 68  million homes across Europe and Central Asia can view the pan-European version of Nickelodeon. In a number of countries in Europe also host a local version of the channel and/or localized programming blocks. The UK/Ireland version of the network launched their HD simulcast channel on 5 October 2010 over Sky, and it is expected that further launches of HD channels will occur across the continent in the next few years.

Global on-air identity
In January 2010, Viacom International launched a global on-air identity campaign for its Nickelodeon channels worldwide (except Nickelodeon US, which adopted the new look identity 28 September 2009). The new look on air-identity debuted on France (29 January 2010), UK and Ireland (15 February 2010), Poland (1 March), in Africa on 13 March 2010, and on Nickelodeon Netherlands, Germany, Nickelodeon Austria and Nickelodeon German-speaking Switzerland on 31 March 2010. The new look design incorporates the newly designed Nickelodeon logo which originally launched on Nickelodeon US in September, 2009. The roll-out of Nickelodeon's new global on-air, online and offline branding will take place throughout 2010 on all Nickelodeon channels worldwide (with exception to Nickelodeon US). Nickelodeon Europe picked up the new 2011 look from Nick USA in 2012. The first country to pick up the new bumpers was Nickelodeon (UK and Ireland). It first got random airings of these bumpers in October 2011 and they were fully used from 2 January 2012.

Localized Nickelodeon channels in Europe, The Middle East & Africa (excluding countries which use Nickelodeon Central & Eastern Europe)

References

External links
UK and Ireland Site
Africa Site
Belgium Site
Czech Site
Denmark Site
Germany Site
Greek Site
Hungary Site
Israel Site
Italy Site
Middle East Site
Netherlands Site
Norway site
Poland Site
Portugal Site
Russia Site
Spain Site
Sweden Site
Turkey Site

Nickelodeon
Children's television networks
Television channels and stations established in 1993
1993 establishments in Europe
Television channel articles with incorrect naming style